The 2016 Texas Senate elections took place as part of the biennial United States elections. Texas voters elected state senators in 16 of the 31 state senate districts. State senators serve four-year terms in the Texas State Senate. A statewide map of Texas's state Senate districts can be obtained from the Texas Legislative Council here, and individual district maps can be obtained from the U.S. Census here.

Following the 2014 State Senate elections, the Republicans maintained effective control of the Senate with twenty members to the Democrats' eleven.

To claim control of the chamber from Republicans, the Democrats needed to gain five Senate seats. While the statewide popular vote for this class of Senators swung 8.6 percentage points toward the Democrats when compared to the vote they earned in the 2012 elections, both parties retained the eight seats each was defending.

Summary of race results

Notes

References

Senate
Texas Senate
Texas State Senate elections